This list includes Project M tournament results.

Major tournament results

References

Project M